Herbie is a masculine given name, often a short form (hypocorism) of Herbert, and a nickname.

It may refer to:

People
 Herbert Herbie Baxter (1883—1962), English cricketer
 Herbert Herbie Crichlow (born 1968), British music producer and songwriter
 Herbert Herbie Evans (1894–1982), Welsh footballer
 Herbie Faye (1899–1980), American actor and vaudeville comedian
 Herbie Fields (1919–1958), American jazz musician
 Herbert Flam (1928–1980), American tennis player
 Brian Herbie Flowers (born 1938), UK bass player and composer
 Hubert Herbie Goins (1939–2015), American rhythm & blues singer
 Herbert Herbie Hancock (born 1940), American jazz musician, bandleader, composer and actor
 Herbert Herbie Harper (1920—2012), American jazz trombonist 
 Herbert Herbie Hewett (1864–1921), English amateur first-class cricketer
 Herbie Hide,  born Herbert Okechukwu Maduagwu in 1971, British former professional boxer
 Herbert Herbie Jones (1926–2001), American jazz trumpeter and arranger
 Herbert Herbie Kronowitz (1923–2012), American boxer and boxing referee
 Herbie Lewis (1941–2007), American hard bop double bassist
 Herbert Herbie Lewis (ice hockey) (1906–1991), Canadian National Hockey League player
 Herbie Lovelle (1924–2009), American drummer
 Herbie Mann (1930–2003), stage name of jazz flutist Herbert Jay Solomon 
 Herbert Herbie Martin (1927–2014), Northern Ireland-born cricketer and rugby union player
 John Herbert Herbie Moran (1884–1954), American Major League Baseball player
 Herbert Herbie Nichols (1919–1963), American jazz pianist and composer
 Alfred G. Herbie Pennell (1921–2000), American polo player
 Herbert Herbie Phillips (1935–1995), American jazz trumpeter, big band composer and arranger
 Herbie Redmond (1929–1990), dancing groundskeeper of the Detroit Tigers Major League Baseball team
 Herbert Herbie Rich (1944–2004), American multi-instrumentalist
 Herbie Seneviratne (1925-1998), Sri Lankan Sinhala actor and filmmaker
 Herbie Smith (cricketer) (1914–1997), Australian cricketer
 Herbie Smith (footballer) (1895–1959), Australian rules footballer
 Herbert Herbie Steward (1926–2003), American jazz saxophonist
 Herbert Herbie Taylor (1889–1973), South African cricketer
 Herbert Herbie Tonkes (1921–1991), Australian rules footballer
 Herbert Herbie Williams, Jr. (born 1940), Welsh former footballer
 Herbie Wood (1920–2001), Australian rules footballer

Fictional characters
 Herbie, an anthropomorphic Volkswagen Beetle car of Disney films and television
 H.E.R.B.I.E., a robot, part of the Fantastic Four
 Herbie Husker, mascot for the Nebraska Cornhuskers
 Herbie Popnecker, a comic book character
 Herbie, nickname of RB-34, a telepathic robot in Isaac Asimov's short story "Liar!"

See also
 Herbert Blitzstein (1934–1997), American mobster known as "Fat Herbie"

English-language masculine given names
Hypocorisms
Lists of people by nickname